A territory is an area of land, sea, or space, belonging or connected to a particular country, person, or animal. 

In international politics, a territory is either the total area from which a state may extract power resources or else an administrative division, i.e. an area that is under the jurisdiction of a sovereign state. 

As a subdivision, a territory in most countries is an organized division of an area that is controlled by a country but is not formally developed into, or incorporated into, a political unit of that country, which political units are of equal status to one another and are often referred to by words such as "provinces", "regions", or "states". In its narrower sense, it is "a geographic region, such as a colonial possession, that is dependent on an external government."

Etymology
The origins of the word "territory" begin with the Proto-Indo-European root ters ('to dry'). From this emerged the Latin word terra ('earth, land') and later the Latin word territorium ('land around a town'). Territory made its debut as a word in Middle English during the 14th century. At this point the suffix -orium, which denotes place, was replaced with -ory which also expresses place.

Types 
Examples for different types of territory include the following:

 Capital territory
 Dependent territory
 Disputed territory, a geographic area claimed by two or more rival governments. For example, the territory of Kashmir is claimed by the governments of both India and Pakistan; for each country involved in the dispute, the whole territory is claimed as a part of the existing state. Another example is the Republic of China (commonly labeled "Taiwan"), whose sovereignty status is disputed by and territory claimed by the People's Republic of China.
 Federal territory
 Maritime territory
 Occupied territory, a region that is under the military control of an outside power that has not gained universal recognition from the international community. Current examples are Crimea, occupied by the Russian Federation; East Jerusalem, the Gaza Strip, the Golan Heights, and the West Bank, occupied by the State of Israel; Western Sahara, partially occupied by the Kingdom of Morocco. Other examples of occupied territory include the country of Kuwait after it was briefly invaded by Iraq in 1990, Iraq after the American invasion of 2003, Germany after World War II, and Kosovo after 1999.
 Overseas territory
 Unorganized territory, a region of land without a "normally" constituted system of government. This does not mean that the territory has no government at all or that it is an unclaimed territory. In practice, such territories are always sparsely populated.

Capital territory

A capital territory or federal capital territory is usually a specially designated territory where a country's seat of government is located.  As such, in the federal model of government, no one state or territory takes pre-eminence because the capital lies within its borders. A capital territory can be one specific form of federal district.

 In Australia, the capital Canberra lies within the Australian Capital Territory and was originally called the FCT.
 The National Capital Territory of Delhi is where New Delhi, the capital of India, is located. 
 Nigeria has its capital Abuja in the Federal Capital Territory.
 In Pakistan, the capital city Islamabad lies within the Islamabad Capital Territory.
 In the United States, the capital city Washington lies within the District of Columbia.

Dependent territory

A dependent territory is a territory that is not an independent sovereign state, yet remains politically outside the governing state's integral area. Presently, all dependent territories are either overseas territories or non-sovereign associated states. Only four countries currently possess dependent territories: New Zealand, Norway, the United Kingdom, and the United States.

Examples include:

 Tokelau is a non-self-governing territory of New Zealand.
 Bouvet Island is an uninhabited dependent territory of Norway.
 The three Crown Dependencies are self-governing possessions of the British Crown similar to freely associated states, not parts of the United Kingdom itself nor of any of its four constituent countries.
 American Samoa, Guam, the Northern Mariana Islands, Puerto Rico, and the U.S. Virgin Islands are unincorporated territories of the United States with varying degrees of local autonomy.

Federal territory

A federal territory is an area within the direct and usually exclusive jurisdiction of the central or national government within a federation.

Australia 

Australia has ten federal territories, out of which three are "internal territories" (the Australian Capital Territory, the Jervis Bay Territory, and the Northern Territory) on mainland Australia; and the other seven are "external territories" (Ashmore and Cartier Islands, Christmas Island, the Cocos (Keeling) Islands, the Coral Sea Islands, Heard Island and McDonald Islands, Norfolk Island, and the Australian Antarctic Territory), which are offshore dependent territories.

Canada 

Canada has three federal territories in addition to its 10 provinces. The territories are officially under the direct control of the federal government and are created by statute (while provinces had constitutional jurisdiction), but in practice they operate similar to provinces.

Each territory has a premier, legislative assembly, and Commissioner (who performs a similar role to a lieutenant governor).

The territories are, from west to east, the Yukon, the Northwest Territories, and Nunavut.

Others
 Federal Capital Territory (Nigeria)
 Federal Territories of Malaysia
 Islamabad Capital Territory (Pakistan)
 Territories of the United States
 Union Territories of India

Overseas territory

Overseas territory is a broad designation for a territorial entity that is separated from the country that governs it by an ocean. An overseas territory may be either a constituent part of the governing state or a dependent territory.

Examples include:

 The Faroe Islands and Greenland are overseas autonomous territories of the Kingdom of Denmark that are internally self-governing.
 Overseas France includes the five overseas collectivities of France, which are broadly autonomous territories, as well as overseas regions and overseas departments, which are essentially the same as the regions and departments in Metropolitan France. Nonetheless, all are integral parts of the French Fifth Republic.
 The Azores and Madeira are the Autonomous Regions of Portugal.
 The fourteen British Overseas Territories are dependent territories of the British Crown with varying degrees of self-governance, not parts of the United Kingdom itself nor of any of its four constituent countries.
 Non-contiguous U.S. territories, territories cut off from the contiguous United States by foreign land borders and are accessible by sea.

See also 
Ad coelum
 List of enclaves and exclaves
 :Category:Territories under military occupation

References

External links
 Peace Palace Library – Research Guide

 
Types of administrative division
Types of geographical division